Kavayitri Bahinabai Chaudhari North Maharashtra University is a university situated in Jalgaon, Maharashtra. Formerly North Maharashtra University was established on 15 August 1990 after separating it from the parent University of Pune.

In 2001, NAAC accredited the prestigious 4-Star Status to the university. The university was re-accredited by NAAC as 'B'(CGPA 2.88 on 4 point scale) grade university.  Currently during the third cycle re-accreditation by NAAC, the university has been awarded with 'A' grade (CGPA 3.11 on 4-point scale)

Campus
The university campus is located about 8 km away from Jalgaon and 1.5 km away from the Asia Highway No. 46.

Academics 
 The university library has six floors and more than 50,000 books. There are more than 500 magazines subscribed in the Library reading section.
Research students of the North Maharashtra University establish the North Maharashtra University Research Scholar Association on 14 September 2009 by the hand of Honorable Prin. Dr. K. B. Patil (V. C.).  Currently there are 62 members comprising the university's teaching faculty.
Separate hostel facilities for male and female students are available on the campus on the basis of merit and certain other restrictions. Staff quarters are located within the campus.

Schools and departments

 Schools
School of Physical Sciences.
School of Chemical Sciences.
School of Chemical Sciences runs six master and Ph.D. programs.  These programs are Master in Chemistry having six different specialisations - viz. Polymer Chemistry, Pesticides and Agrochemical Chemistry, Industrial Chemistry, Physical Chemistry, Organic Chemistry, Analytical Chemistry. The school is engaged in having nice industry university interactions by doing applied and industrial research.  The school is also engaged in basic research and received number of projects from various Govt. funding agencies such as UGC, DST, CSIR, DRDO, etc. Students of the school are also receiving jobs in industries, and many of them have established their own industries.  
School of Environmental and Earth Sciences 
School of Life Sciences.
School of Mathematical Sciences.
School of Environmental Sciences.
School of Social Sciences.

Departments
Department of Applied Geography
University Department of Chemical Technology (UDCT)
Department of Computer Science
Department of Management Studies
Department of Information Technology
Department of Comparative Languages & Literature
Department of Library & Information Science
Department of Education
Department of Law
Department of Performing Arts
Pratap Philosophy Center, Amalner

Affiliated colleges
Its jurisdiction extends over 3 districts -Dhule,Jalgaon,Nandurbhar .

References

External links

Universities in Maharashtra
Education in Jalgaon
Educational institutions established in 1990
1990 establishments in Maharashtra